This list shows the IUCN Red List status of the 261 mammal species occurring in Iran. Two of them are critically endangered, six are endangered, 17 are vulnerable, and five are near threatened. Another 11 species are likely present.
The following tags are used to highlight each species' status as assessed on the respective IUCN Red List published by the International Union for Conservation of Nature:

Order: Sirenia (manatees and dugongs) 

Sirenia is an order of fully aquatic, herbivorous mammals that inhabit rivers, estuaries, coastal marine waters, swamps, and marine wetlands. All four species are endangered.
 Family: Dugongidae
 Genus: Dugong
 Dugong, D. dugon  presence uncertain, possible vagrant

Order: Rodentia (rodents) 

Rodents make up the largest order of mammals, with over 40% of mammalian species. They have two incisors in the upper and lower jaw which grow continually and must be kept short by gnawing.
 Suborder: Hystricomorpha
 Family: Hystricidae
 Genus: Hystrix
 Indian crested porcupine, H. indica 
 Suborder: Sciurognathi
 Family: Sciuridae (squirrels)
 Subfamily: Sciurinae
 Tribe: Sciurini
 Genus: Sciurus
 Caucasian squirrel, S. anomalus LC
 Subfamily: Callosciurinae
 Genus: Funambulus
 Northern palm squirrel, Funambulus pennantii LC
 Subfamily: Xerinae
 Tribe: Xerini
 Genus: Spermophilopsis
 Long-clawed ground squirrel, Spermophilopsis leptodactylus LC
 Tribe: Marmotini
 Genus: Spermophilus
 Yellow ground squirrel, S. fulvus LC
  Asia Minor ground squirrel, S. xanthoprymnus NT
 Family: Gliridae (dormice)
 Subfamily: Leithiinae
 Genus: Dryomys
 Forest dormouse, Dryomys nitedula LC
 Genus: Myomimus
 Masked mouse-tailed dormouse, Myomimus personatus DD
 Setzer's mouse-tailed dormouse, Myomimus setzeri DD
 Subfamily: Glirinae
 Genus: Glis
 Iranian edible dormouse, Glis persicus NE
 Family: Dipodidae (jerboas)
 Subfamily: Allactaginae
 Genus: Allactaga
 Small five-toed jerboa, Allactaga elater LC
 Euphrates jerboa, Allactaga euphratica LC
 Iranian jerboa, Allactaga firouzi DD
 Hotson's jerboa, Allactaga hotsoni LC
 Williams' jerboa, Allactaga williamsi LC
 Tousi jerboa, Allactaga toussi
 Genus: Pygeretmus
 Dwarf fat-tailed jerboa, Pygeretmus pumilio LC
 Subfamily: Dipodinae
 Genus: Dipus
 Northern three-toed jerboa, Dipus sagitta LC
 Genus: Jaculus
 Blanford's jerboa, Jaculus blanfordi LC
 Lesser Egyptian jerboa, Jaculus jaculus LC
 Thaler three-toed jerboa, Jaculus thaleri
 Family: Spalacidae
 Genus: Spalax
 Lesser mole rat, Spalax leucodon LC
 Family: Calomyscidae
 Genus: Calomyscus
 Zagros Mountains mouse-like hamster, Calomyscus bailwardi LC
 Afghan mouse-like hamster, Calomyscus mystax LC
 Urar mouse-like hamster, Calomyscus urartensis LC
 Goodwin's mouse-like hamster, Calomyscus elburzensis LC
 Noble mouse-like hamster, Calomyscus grandis
 Family: Cricetidae
 Subfamily: Cricetinae
 Genus: Cricetulus
 Grey dwarf hamster, Cricetulus migratorius LC
 Genus: Mesocricetus
 Turkish hamster, Mesocricetus brandti LC
 Golden hamster, Mesocricetus auratus LC
 Subfamily: Arvicolinae
 Genus: Arvicola
 European water vole, A. amphibius 
 Genus: Blanfordimys
 Afghan vole, Blanfordimys afghanus LC
 Genus: Chionomys
 European snow vole, Chionomys nivalis
 Genus: Ellobius
 Northern mole vole, Ellobius talpinus LC
 Southern mole vole, Ellobius fuscocapillus LC
 Transcaucasian mole vole, Ellobius lutescens LC
 Genus: Microtus
 Günther's vole, Microtus guentheri LC
 Persian vole, Microtus irani LC
 Baluchistan vole, Microtus kermanensis EN
 Altai vole, Microtus obscurus LC
 Social vole, Microtus socialis LC
 Transcaspian vole, Microtus transcaspicus LC
 European pine vole, Microtus subterraneus LC
 Common vole, Microtus arvalis LC
 Major's pine vole, Microtus majori LC
 Sibling vole, Microtus levis
 Qazvin vole, Microtus qazvinensis
 Paradox vole, Microtus paradoxus
 Schelkovnikov's pine vole, Microtus schelkovnikovi
 Daghestan pine vole, Microtus daghestanicus
 Family: Muridae (mice, rats, voles, gerbils, hamsters, etc.)
 Subfamily: Deomyinae
 Genus: Acomys
 Cairo spiny mouse, Acomys cahirinus LC
 Eastern spiny mouse, Acomys dimidiatus
 Subfamily: Gerbillinae
 Genus: Gerbillus
 Swarthy gerbil, Gerbillus aquilus LC
 Cheesman's gerbil, Gerbillus cheesmani LC
 Harrison's gerbil, Gerbillus mesopotamiae LC
 Balochistan gerbil, Gerbillus nanus LC
 Pygmy gerbil, Gerbillus henleyi
 Genus: Meriones
 Sundevall's jird, Meriones crassus LC
 Indian desert jird, Meriones hurrianae LC
 Libyan jird, Meriones libycus LC
 Mid-day jird, Meriones meridianus LC
 Persian jird, Meriones persicus LC
 Tristram's jird, Meriones tristrami LC
 Vinogradov's jird, Meriones vinogradovi LC
 Zarudny's jird, Meriones zarudnyi EN
 Dahl's jird, Meriones dahli
 Genus: Rhombomys
 Great gerbil, Rhombomys opimus LC
 Genus: Tatera
 Indian gerbil, Tatera indica LC
 Subfamily: Murinae
 Genus: Apodemus
 Persian field mouse, Apodemus arianus LC
 Yellow-breasted field mouse, Apodemus fulvipectus LC
 Broad-toothed field mouse, Apodemus mystacinus LC
 Black Sea field mouse, Apodemus ponticus LC
 Ward's field mouse, Apodemus wardi LC
 Hyrcanian field mouse, Apodemus hyrcanicus
 Yellow-necked field mouse, Apodemus flavicollis
 Ural field mouse, Apodemus uralensis
 Steppe field mouse, Apodemus witherbyi
 Apodemus avicennicus
 Genus: Golunda
 Indian bush rat, Golunda ellioti LC
 Genus: Mus
 Macedonian mouse, Mus macedonicus 
 House mouse, M. musculus 
 Genus: Nesokia
 Short-tailed bandicoot rat, Nesokia indica LC
 Genus: Rattus
 Brown rat, R. norvegicus  introduced
 Black rat, R. rattus  introduced
 Turkestan rat, R. turkestanicus LC
 Family: Myocastoridae
 Genus: Myocastor
 Coypu, Myocastor coypus

Order: Lagomorpha 

The lagomorphs comprise the families Leporidae and Ochotonidae. Though members can resemble rodents, and were classified as a superfamily in that order until the early 20th century, they have since been considered a separate order. They differ from rodents in a number of physical characteristics, such as having four incisors in the upper jaw rather than two.
 Family: Leporidae
 Genus: Lepus
 Cape hare, L. capensis 
 European hare, L. europaeus 
 Tolai hare, L. tolai 
 Family: Ochotonidae
 Genus: Ochotona
 Afghan pika, O. rufescens

Order: Erinaceomorpha (hedgehogs and gymnures) 

The order Erinaceomorpha contains a single family, Erinaceidae, which comprise the hedgehogs and gymnures. The hedgehogs are easily recognised by their spines while gymnures look more like large rats.
 Family: Erinaceidae (hedgehogs)
 Subfamily: Erinaceinae
 Genus: Erinaceus
 Southern white-breasted hedgehog, E. concolor 
 Genus: Hemiechinus
 Long-eared hedgehog, H. auritus 
 Genus: Paraechinus
 Desert hedgehog, P. aethiopicus 
 Brandt's hedgehog, P. hypomelas

Order: Soricomorpha (shrews, moles, and solenodons) 

The "shrew-forms" are insectivorous mammals. The shrews and solenodons closely resemble mice while the moles are stout-bodied burrowers.
 Family: Soricidae (shrews)
 Subfamily: Crocidurinae
 Genus: Crocidura
 Caspian shrew, C. caspica 
 Gmelin's white-toothed shrew, C. gmelini 
 Bicolored shrew, C. leucodon 
 Katinka's shrew, C. katinka  presence uncertain
 Lesser white-toothed shrew, C. suaveolens 
 Iranian shrew, C. susiana 
 Zarudny's shrew, C. zarudnyi 
 Subfamily: Soricinae
 Tribe: Nectogalini
 Genus: Neomys
 Mediterranean water shrew, N. anomalus
 Transcaucasian water shrew, N. schelkovnikovi 
 Tribe: Soricini
 Genus: Sorex
 Caucasian pygmy shrew, S. volnuchini 
 Genus:  Suncus
 Asian house shrew, S. murinus introduced, presence uncertain
 Pygmy white-toothed shrew, S. etruscus
 Family: Talpidae (moles)
 Subfamily: Talpinae
 Tribe: Talpini
 Genus: Talpa
 Père David's mole, T. davidiana 
 Levant mole, T. levantis

Order: Chiroptera (bats) 

The bats' most distinguishing feature is that their forelimbs are developed as wings, making them the only mammals capable of flight. Bat species account for about 20% of all mammals.
 Family: Pteropodidae (flying foxes, Old World fruit bats)
 Subfamily: Pteropodinae
 Genus: Rousettus
 Egyptian fruit bat, R. aegyptiacus 
 Family: Vespertilionidae
 Subfamily: Myotinae
 Genus: Myotis
 Steppe whiskered bat, M. aurascens 
 Long-fingered bat, M. capaccinii 
 Bechstein's bat, M. bechsteini 
 Lesser mouse-eared bat, M. blythii 
 Geoffroy's bat, M. emarginatus 
 Whiskered bat, M. mystacinus 
 Natterer's bat, M. nattereri 
 Nepal myotis, M. nipalensis 
 Schaub's myotis, M. schaubi 
 Subfamily: Vespertilioninae
 Genus: Barbastella
 Western barbastelle, B. barbastellus 
 Eastern barbastelle, B. leucomelas 
 Barbastella caspica
 Genus: Otonycteris
 Desert long-eared bat, O. hemprichii 
 Turkestani long-eared bat, O. leucophaea 
 Genus: Eptesicus
 E. anatolicus 
 Bobrinski's serotine, E. bobrinskoi 
 Botta's serotine, E. bottae 
 Northern bat, E. nilssoni 
 E. ognevi 
 E. pachyomus 
 Serotine bat, E. serotinus 
 Eptesicus pachyomus
 Genus: Hypsugo
 Arabian pipistrelle, H. arabicus 
 Savi's pipistrelle, H. savii 
 Genus: Nyctalus
 Greater noctule bat, N. lasiopterus 
 Lesser noctule, N. leisleri 
 Common noctule, N. noctula 
 Genus: Pipistrellus
 Kuhl's pipistrelle, P. kuhlii 
 Common pipistrelle, P. pipistrellus 
 Soprano pipistrelle, P. pygmaeus 
 Genus: Plecotus
 Brown long-eared bat, P. auritus 
 Grey long-eared bat, P. austriacus 
 Mountain long-eared bat, P. macrobullaris 
 P. strelkovi 
 Genus: Vespertilio
 Parti-coloured bat, V. murinus 
 Genus: Rhyneptesicus
 Sind bat, R. nasutus 
 Family: Rhinopomatidae
 Genus: Rhinopoma
 Lesser mouse-tailed bat, R. hardwickei 
 Greater mouse-tailed bat, R. microphyllum 
 Small mouse-tailed bat, R. muscatellum 
 Family: Emballonuridae
 Genus: Taphozous
 Naked-rumped tomb bat, T. nudiventris 
 Egyptian tomb bat, T. perforatus 
 Family: Rhinolophidae
 Subfamily: Rhinolophinae
 Genus: Rhinolophus
 Blasius's horseshoe bat, R. blasii 
 Mediterranean horseshoe bat, R. euryale 
 Bokhara horseshoe bat, R. bocharicus 
 Greater horseshoe bat, R. ferrumequinum 
 Lesser horseshoe bat, R. hipposideros 
 Mehely's horseshoe bat, R. mehelyi 
 Subfamily: Hipposiderinae
 Genus: Asellia
 Trident leaf-nosed bat, A. tridens 
 Genus: Triaenops
 Persian trident bat, T. persicus 
 Family: Molossidae
 Genus: Tadarida
 Egyptian free-tailed bat, T. aegyptiaca 
 European free-tailed bat, T. teniotis

Order: Cetacea (whales) 

The order Cetacea includes whales, dolphins and porpoises. They are the mammals most fully adapted to aquatic life with a spindle-shaped nearly hairless body, protected by a thick layer of blubber, and forelimbs and tail modified to provide propulsion underwater.

More than 14 species have been recorded within Iran's exclusive economic zone.
 Suborder: Mysticeti
 Family: Balaenopteridae
 Subfamily: Balaenopterinae
 Genus: Balaenoptera
 Sei whale, B. borealis 
 Bryde's whale, B. edeni 
 Blue whale, B. musculus 
 Omura's whale, B. omurai 
 Fin whale, B. physalus 
 Common minke whale, B. acutorostrata
 Genus: Globicephala
 Short-finned pilot whale, G. macrorhynchus Genus: Kogia Dwarf sperm whale, K. Sima Genus: Orcinus Killer whale, O. Orca Genus: Physeter Sperm whale, P. macrocephalus Genus: Ziphius Cuvier's beaked whale, Z. cavirostris Subfamily: Megapterinae
 Genus: Megaptera Humpback whale, Megaptera novaeangliae CR (Arabian Sea population)
 Suborder: Odontoceti
 Superfamily: Platanistoidea
 Family: Phocoenidae
 Genus: Neophocaena Finless porpoise, Neophocaena phocaenoides DD
 Family: Delphinidae (marine dolphins)
 Genus: Sousa Indo-Pacific humpback dolphin, Sousa chinensis DD
 Genus: Steno Rough-toothed dolphin, Steno bredanensis DD
 Genus: Tursiops Bottlenose dolphin, Tursiops aduncus DD
 Genus: Stenella Spinner dolphin, Stenella longirostris DD
 Genus: Delphinus Long-beaked common dolphin, Delphinus capensis DD
 Genus: Lagenodelphis Fraser's dolphin, Lagenodelphis hosei DD
 Genus: Grampus Risso's dolphin, Grampus griseus DD
 Genus: Feresa Pygmy killer whale, Feresa attenuata DD
 Genus: Peponocephala Melon-headed whale, Peponocephala electra DD
 Genus: Pseudorca False killer whale, Pseudorca crassidens DD

 Order: Carnivora (carnivorans) 

There are over 260 species of carnivorans, the majority of which feed primarily on meat. They have a characteristic skull shape and dentition.
 Suborder: Feliformia
 Family: Felidae
 Subfamily: Felinae
 Genus: Acinonyx Cheetah, A. jubatus Asiatic cheetah, A. j. venaticus 
 Genus: Caracal Caracal, C. caracal 
 Genus: FelisJungle cat, F. chaus 
African wildcat, F. lybica 
Asiatic wildcat, F. l. ornataSand cat, F. margarita 
Turkestan sand cat, F. m. thinobiaGenus: Lynx Eurasian lynx, L. lynx 
 Genus: Otocolobus Pallas's cat, O. manul 
 Subfamily: Pantherinae
 Genus: Panthera Leopard, P. pardus 
 Panthera pardus tulliana 
 Family: Herpestidae (mongooses)
 Genus: Urva Small Indian mongoose, U. auropunctata 
 Indian grey mongoose, U. edwardsii 
 Family: Hyaenidae (hyaenas)
 Genus: Hyaena Striped hyena, H. hyaena 
 Suborder: Caniformia
 Family: Canidae
 Genus: Canis Golden jackal, C. aureus 
 Persian jackal, C. a. aureus Gray wolf, C. lupus 
 Steppe wolf, C. l. campestris Indian wolf, C. l. pallipes Genus: Vulpes Blanford's fox, V. cana 
 Corsac fox, V. corsac 
 Rüppell's fox, V. rueppellii 
 Red fox, V. vulpes 
 Family: Ursidae (bears)
 Genus: Ursus Brown bear, U. arctos 
 Asiatic black bear, U. thibetanus 
 Family: Mustelidae (mustelids)
 Genus: Lutra European otter, L. lutra 
 Genus: Martes Beech marten, M. foina 
 European pine marten, M. martes 
 Genus: Meles Caucasian badger, M. canescens 
 Genus: Mellivora Honey badger, M. capensis 
 Genus: Mustela Least weasel, M. nivalis 
 Genus: Vormela Marbled polecat, V. peregusna 
 Family: Phocidae (earless seals)
 Genus: Pusa Caspian seal, P. caspica 

 Order: Perissodactyla (odd-toed ungulates) 
The odd-toed ungulates are browsing and grazing mammals. They are usually large to very large, and have relatively simple stomachs and a large middle toe.
 Family: Equidae (horses etc.)
 Genus: Equus Onager, E. hemionus 
 Syrian wild ass, E. h. hemippus 
 Indian wild ass, E. h. khur 
 Persian onager, E. h. onager 

 Order: Artiodactyla (even-toed ungulates) 

The even-toed ungulates are ungulates whose weight is borne about equally by the third and fourth toes, rather than mostly or entirely by the third as in perissodactyls. There are about 220 artiodactyl species, including many that are of great economic importance to humans.
 Family: Bovidae (cattle, antelope, buffalo, sheep, goats)
 Subfamily: Antilopinae
 Genus: Gazella Chinkara, G. bennettii 
 Goitered gazelle, G. subgutturosa 
 Subfamily: Caprinae
 Genus: Capra Wild goat, C. aegagrus 
 Bezoar ibex, C. a. aegagrus Genus: Ovis Mouflon, O. gmelini 
 Armenian mouflon, O. g. gmelini Urial, O. vignei 
 Family: Cervidae (deer)
 Subfamily: Cervinae
 Genus: Cervus Red deer, C. elaphus 
 Genus: Dama Persian fallow deer, D. mesopotamica 
 Subfamily: Capreolinae
 Genus: Capreolus
 European roe deer, C. capreolus 
 Family: Suidae (pigs)
 Subfamily: Suinae
 Genus: Sus
 Wild boar, S. scrofa

Locally extinct 
The following species are locally extinct in Iran:
 Eurasian beaver, Castor fiber
 Lion, Panthera leo
 Tiger, Panthera tigris

See also 
 List of chordate orders
 Lists of mammals by region
 List of prehistoric mammals
 Mammal classification
 List of mammals described in the 2000s
 Wildlife of Iran

References

External links 
 Current status of rodents of Iran (in Persian)

Iran
Iran
'Iran
mammals
'mammals